Villu Müüripeal (17 June 1937 – 9 December 2005) was an Estonian agronomist and politician. Müüripeal was born in Varbla and was a practitioner of the Taara faith. He was a member of VIII Riigikogu.

References

1937 births
2005 deaths
Members of the Riigikogu, 1995–1999
Estonian modern pagans
People from Lääneranna Parish